Lactifluus pseudoflocktoniae is a species of mushroom in the family Russulaceae. It was described by Teresa Lebel, James K. Douch, Lachlan Tegart, and Luke Vaughan in 2021. The specific epithet refers to Lactifluus flocktoniae, to which this species has a strong resemblance. The type locality is near Cann River, Australia.

See also 
 
 List of Lactifluus species
 Fungi of Australia

References

External links 
 

Fungi described in 2021
Fungi of Australia
Lactifluus
Taxa named by Teresa Lebel